Scott Peak may refer to:
 Scott Peak (Idaho)
 Scott Peak (Alaska)